Sargocentron suborbitale, the tinsel squirrelfish, is a species of squirrelfish belonging to the genus Sargocentron. It can be found in the East Pacific Ocean from the Gulf of California to Ecuador including the Galapagos Islands. During the day, adults of the species hide in small caves or crevices of rocks. During the night, they feed on small crustaceans in the intertidal zone. It is oviparous.

References

suborbitale
Fish of the Pacific Ocean
Taxa named by Theodore Gill